The Llogara Pass; is a high mountain pass within the Ceraunian Mountains along the Albanian Riviera. It connects the Dukat Valley in the north with Himarë in the south. Orikum is the nearest city on the northern side of the pass and the village of Dhërmi in the south. 

In November 1912, during the Himara revolt a Greek unit was positioned on the Llogara in order to defend the region of Himara from Ottoman-Albanian attacks from the direction of Vlorë.

See also 
 Llogara National Park
 Geography of Albania
 Mountain passes of Albania

References 

 
 

Mountain passes of Albania
Llogara National Park